Van Wie Creek is a river in the state of New York. It flows into the Mohawk River near Randall, New York.

References 

Rivers of Montgomery County, New York
Mohawk River
Rivers of New York (state)